Jean-Claude Mbemba (born 2 December 1963 in the Republic of the Congo) is a Republic of the Congo retired international footballer.

References

Association football midfielders
Living people
Republic of the Congo footballers
1963 births
Vasas SC players
Republic of the Congo international footballers